Paula Renata Marques Pequeno, better known as Paula Pequeno (born January 22, 1982), is a two-time Olympic gold medal winning volleyball player from Brazil. She was born in Brasília, Distrito Federal. She plays for Vôlei Bauru.

Career
Pequeno was part of the National Team which won the gold medal at the 2011 Pan American Games held in Guadalajara, Mexico.

Pequeno played with Fenerbahçe in the 2012 FIVB Club World Championship held in Doha, Qatar and helped her team to win the bronze medal after defeating Puerto Rico's Lancheras de Cataño 3-0.

Clubs
 ASBAC (1994–1997)
 Leites Nestlé (1997–1998)
 Dayvit (1998–1999)
 Finasa Osasco (1999–2009)
 Zarechie Odintsovo (2009–2010)
 Vôlei Futuro (2010–2012)
 Fenerbahçe Istanbul (2012–2013)
 Brasília Vôlei (2013–2017)
 Vôlei Bauru (2017–2018)
 Osasco/Audax (2018–2019)

Awards

Individuals
 2000 U20 South American Championship – "Best Spiker"
 2005 FIVB World Grand Prix – "Most Valuable Player"
 2007 South American Championship – "Most Valuable Player"
 2007–08 Brazilian Superliga – "Best Spiker" 
 2008 Summer Olympics – "Most Valuable Player"

Clubs
 2001–02 Brazilian Superliga –  Runner-up, with Finasa Osasco
 2002–03 Brazilian Superliga –  Champion, with Finasa Osasco
 2003–04 Brazilian Superliga –  Champion, with Finasa Osasco
 2004–05 Brazilian Superliga –  Champion, with Finasa Osasco
 2005–06 Brazilian Superliga –  Runner-up, with Finasa Osasco
 2006–07 Brazilian Superliga –  Runner-up, with Finasa Osasco
 2007–08 Brazilian Superliga –  Runner-up, with Finasa Osasco
 2008–09 Brazilian Superliga –  Runner-up, with Finasa Osasco
 2009–10 Russian Super League –  Champion, with Zarechye Odintsovo
 2012–13 CEV Cup –  Runner-up, with Fenerbahçe
 2012 FIVB Club World Championship –  Bronze medal, with Fenerbahçe

References

External links

 Paula Pequeno at the International Volleyball Federation
 
 
 
 

1982 births
Living people
Brazilian women's volleyball players
Sportspeople from Brasília
Volleyball players at the 2008 Summer Olympics
Olympic volleyball players of Brazil
Olympic gold medalists for Brazil
Volleyball players at the 2007 Pan American Games
Volleyball players at the 2011 Pan American Games
Olympic medalists in volleyball
Volleyball players at the 2012 Summer Olympics
Medalists at the 2012 Summer Olympics
Medalists at the 2008 Summer Olympics
Pan American Games gold medalists for Brazil
Pan American Games silver medalists for Brazil
Pan American Games medalists in volleyball
Outside hitters
Expatriate volleyball players in Russia
Expatriate volleyball players in Turkey
Fenerbahçe volleyballers
Brazilian expatriate sportspeople in Turkey
Brazilian expatriates in Russia
Medalists at the 2011 Pan American Games